Ingenio et arti (from Latin: For Science and Art) is a Danish medal awarded to prominent Danish and foreign scientists and artists. The honour, a personal award of the Monarch, was instituted by King Christian VIII in 1841 and could be awarded to women as well as men, e.g. to Bertha Wegmann in 1892 and Emilie Ulrich in 1917.

The reverse shows The Genius of Light, engraved after the 1841 plaster relief by Bertel Thorvaldsen.

The medal is awarded irregularly, on average less than twice per year, and was most recently awarded
to John Neumeier after the première of his ballet Mahler's 3rd Symphony on 19 May 2021 at the Copenhagen Opera House.

Other recipients include artists Anna Ancher and Bjørn Nørgaard, writer Karen Blixen and ballet dancer Kirsten Simone.

References

External links

  Provides details including pictures of obverse and reverse with ribbon of Ingenio et Arti medals awarded to actress Anna Bloch in 1910, sculptor Anne Marie Carl-Nielsen in 1927 and actress Clara Pontoppidan in 1931. Self-published. Navigation in English.

Orders, decorations, and medals of Denmark
1841 establishments in Denmark

Awards established in 1841